

Events

Pre-1600
747 BC – According to Ptolemy, the epoch (origin) of the Nabonassar Era began at noon on this date. Historians use this to establish the modern BC chronology for dating historic events.
 364 – Valentinian I is proclaimed Roman emperor.
1266 – Battle of Benevento: An army led by Charles, Count of Anjou, defeats a combined German and Sicilian force led by Manfred, King of Sicily. Manfred is killed in the battle and Pope Clement IV invests Charles as king of Sicily and Naples.
1365 – The Ava Kingdom and the royal city of Ava (Inwa) founded by King Thado Minbya.

1601–1900
1606 – The Janszoon voyage of 1605–06 becomes the first European expedition to set foot on Australia, although it is mistaken as a part of New Guinea.
1616 – Galileo Galilei is formally banned by the Roman Catholic Church from teaching or defending the view that the earth orbits the sun.
1775 – The British East India Company factory on Balambangan Island is destroyed by Moro pirates.
1794 – The first Christiansborg Palace in Copenhagen burns down.
1815 – Napoleon Bonaparte escapes from exile on the island of Elba.
1870 – The Beach Pneumatic Transit in New York City, intending as a demonstration for a subway line opens.
1876 – Japan and Korea sign the Treaty of Kangwha, which grants Japanese citizens extraterritoriality rights in Korea, opens three Korean ports to Japanese trade, and ends Korea's status as a tributary state of Qing dynasty China.

1901–present
1909 – Kinemacolor, the first successful color motion picture process, is first shown to the general public at the Palace Theatre in London.
1919 – President Woodrow Wilson signs an act of Congress establishing the Grand Canyon National Park.
1929 – President Calvin Coolidge signs legislation establishing the  Grand Teton National Park in Wyoming.
1935 – Adolf Hitler orders the Luftwaffe to be re-formed, violating the provisions of the Treaty of Versailles.
  1935   – Robert Watson-Watt carries out a demonstration near Daventry which leads directly to the development of radar in the United Kingdom.
1936 – In the February 26 Incident, young Japanese military officers attempt to stage a coup against the government.
1945 – World War II: US troops reclaim the Philippine island of Corregidor from the Japanese.
1952 – Vincent Massey is sworn in as the first Canadian-born Governor General of Canada.
1960 – A New York-bound Alitalia airliner crashes into a cemetery in Shannon, Ireland, shortly after takeoff, killing 34 of the 52 persons on board.
1966 – Apollo program: Launch of AS-201, the first flight of the Saturn IB rocket.
1971 – U.N. Secretary-General U Thant signs United Nations proclamation of the vernal equinox as Earth Day.
1979 – The Superliner railcar enters revenue service with Amtrak.
1980 – Egypt and Israel establish full diplomatic relations.
1987 – Iran–Contra affair: The Tower Commission rebukes President Ronald Reagan for not controlling his national security staff.
1992 – First Nagorno-Karabakh War: Khojaly Massacre: Armenian armed forces open fire on Azeri civilians at a military post outside the town of Khojaly leaving hundreds dead.
1993 – World Trade Center bombing: In New York City, a truck bomb parked below the North Tower of the World Trade Center explodes, killing six and injuring over a thousand people.
1995 – The UK's oldest investment banking institute, Barings Bank, collapses after a rogue securities broker Nick Leeson loses $1.4 billion by speculating on the Singapore International Monetary Exchange using futures contracts.
2008 – The New York Philharmonic performs in Pyongyang, North Korea; this is the first event of its kind to take place in North Korea.
2012 – A train derails in Burlington, Ontario, Canada killing at least three people and injuring 45.
  2012   – Seventeen-year-old African-American student Trayvon Martin is shot to death by neighborhood watch coordinator George Zimmerman in an altercation in Sanford, Florida.
2013 – A hot air balloon crashes near Luxor, Egypt, killing 19 people.
2019 – Indian Air Force fighter-jets targeted Jaish-e-Mohammed terrorist training camps in Balakot.
2021 – A total of 279 female students aged between 10 and 17 are kidnapped by bandits in the Zamfara kidnapping in Zamfara State, Nigeria.

Births

Pre-1600
1361 – Wenceslaus IV of Bohemia (d. 1419)
1416 – Christopher of Bavaria (d. 1448)
1564 – Christopher Marlowe, English playwright, poet and translator (d. 1593)
1584 – Albert VI, Duke of Bavaria (d. 1666)
1587 – Stefano Landi, Italian composer and educator (d. 1639)

1601–1900
1629 – Archibald Campbell, 9th Earl of Argyll, Scottish peer (d. 1685)
1651 – Quirinus Kuhlmann, German Baroque poet and mystic (d. 1689)
1671 – Anthony Ashley-Cooper, 3rd Earl of Shaftesbury, English philosopher and politician (d. 1713)
1672 – Antoine Augustin Calmet, French monk and theologian (d. 1757)
1677 – Nicola Fago, Italian composer and teacher (d. 1745)
1718 – Johan Ernst Gunnerus, Norwegian bishop, botanist and zoologist (d. 1773)
1720 – Gian Francesco Albani, Italian cardinal (d. 1803)
1729 – Anders Chydenius, Finnish economist, philosopher and Lutheran priest (d. 1803)
1746 – Maria Amalia, Duchess of Parma (d. 1804)
1770 – Anton Reicha, Bohemian composer and flautist (d. 1836)
1777 – Matija Nenadović, Serbian priest, historian, and politician, 1st Prime Minister of Serbia (d. 1854)
1786 – François Arago, French mathematician and politician, 25th Prime Minister of France (d. 1853)
1802 – Victor Hugo, French author, poet, and playwright (d. 1885)
1808 – Honoré Daumier, French painter, illustrator, and sculptor (d. 1879)
  1808   – Nathan Kelley, American architect, designed the Ohio Statehouse (d. 1871)
1829 – Levi Strauss, German-American fashion designer, founded Levi Strauss & Co. (d. 1902)
1842 – Camille Flammarion, French astronomer and author (d. 1925)
1846 – Buffalo Bill, American soldier and hunter (d. 1917)
1852 – John Harvey Kellogg, American surgeon, co-created Corn flakes (d. 1943)
1857 – Émile Coué, French psychologist and pharmacist (d. 1926)
1861 – Ferdinand I of Bulgaria (d. 1948)
  1861   – Nadezhda Krupskaya, Russian soldier and politician (d. 1939)
1866 – Herbert Henry Dow, Canadian-American businessman, founded the Dow Chemical Company (d. 1930)
1877 – Henry Barwell, Australian politician, 28th Premier of South Australia (d. 1959)
  1877   – Rudolph Dirks, German-American illustrator (d. 1968)
1879 – Frank Bridge, English viola player and composer (d. 1941)
1880 – Kenneth Edgeworth, Irish astronomer (d. 1972)
1881 – Janus Djurhuus, Faroese poet (d. 1948)
1882 – Husband E. Kimmel, American admiral (d. 1968)
1885 – Aleksandras Stulginskis, Lithuanian farmer and politician, 2nd President of Lithuania (d. 1969)
1887 – Grover Cleveland Alexander, American baseball player and coach (d. 1950)
  1887   – William Frawley, American actor and vaudevillian (d. 1966)
  1887   – Stefan Grabiński, Polish author and educator (d. 1936)
1893 – Wallace Fard Muhammad, American religious leader, founded the Nation of Islam (disappeared 1934)
  1893   – Dorothy Whipple, English novelist (d. 1966)
1896 – Andrei Zhdanov, Ukrainian-Russian civil servant and politician (d. 1948)
1899 – Max Petitpierre, Swiss jurist and politician, 54th President of the Swiss Confederation (d. 1994)
1900 – Halina Konopacka, Polish discus thrower and poet (d. 1989)
  1900   – Fritz Wiessner, German-American mountaineer (d. 1988)

1901–present
1902 – Jean Bruller, French author and illustrator, co-founded Les Éditions de Minuit (d. 1991)
1903 – Giulio Natta, Italian chemist and academic, Nobel Prize laureate (d. 1979)
  1903   – Orde Wingate, English general (d. 1944)
1906 – Madeleine Carroll, English actress (d. 1987)
1908 – Tex Avery, American animator, producer, and voice actor (d. 1980)
  1908   – Nestor Mesta Chayres, Mexican operatic tenor and bolero vocalist (d. 1971) 
  1908   – Jean-Pierre Wimille, French racing driver (d. 1949)
1909 – Fanny Cradock, English chef, author, and critic (d. 1994)
  1909   – Talal of Jordan (d. 1972)
1910 – Vic Woodley, English footballer (d. 1978)
1911 – Tarō Okamoto, Japanese painter and sculptor (d. 1996)
1914 – Robert Alda, American actor, singer, and director (d. 1986)
1916 – Jackie Gleason, American actor and singer (d. 1987)
1918 – Otis Bowen, American physician and politician, 44th Governor of Indiana (d. 2013)
  1918   – Pyotr Masherov, Leader of Soviet Belarus (d. 1980)
  1918   – Theodore Sturgeon, American author and critic (d. 1985)
1919 – Mason Adams, American actor (d. 2005)
1920 – Danny Gardella, American baseball player and trainer (d. 2005)
  1920   – Tony Randall, American actor, director, and producer (d. 2004)
  1920   – Lucjan Wolanowski, Polish journalist and author (d. 2006)
1921 – Betty Hutton, American actress and singer (d. 2007)
1922 – Bill Johnston, Australian cricketer and businessman (d. 2007)
  1922   – Margaret Leighton, English actress (d. 1976)
1924 – Noboru Takeshita, Japanese soldier and politician, 74th Prime Minister of Japan (d. 2000)
  1924   – Marc Bucci, American composer, lyricist, and dramatist (d. 2002)
1925 – Everton Weekes, Barbadian cricketer and referee (d. 2020)
1926 – Doris Belack, American actress (d. 2011)
  1926   – Verne Gagne, American football player, wrestler, and trainer (d. 2015)
1927 – Tom Kennedy, American game show host and actor (d. 2020)
1928 – Fats Domino, American singer-songwriter and pianist (d. 2017)
  1928   – Ariel Sharon, Israeli general and politician, 11th Prime Minister of Israel (d. 2014)
1931 – Ally MacLeod, Scottish footballer and manager (d. 2004)
  1931   – Robert Novak, American journalist and author (d. 2009)
  1931   – Josephine Tewson, English actress (d. 2022)
1932 – Johnny Cash, American singer-songwriter, guitarist, and actor (d. 2003)
1933 – James Goldsmith, French-British businessman and politician (d. 1997)
1934 – Mohammed Lakhdar-Hamina, Algerian director, producer, and screenwriter
1936 – José Policarpo, Portuguese cardinal (d. 2014)
1937 – Paul Dickson, American football player and coach (d. 2011)
1939 – Chuck Wepner, American professional boxer
1940 – Oldřich Kulhánek, Czech painter, illustrator, and stage designer (d. 2013)
1942 – Jozef Adamec, Slovak footballer and manager (d. 2018)
1943 – Paul Cotton, American singer-songwriter and guitarist (d. 2021)
  1943   – Bill Duke, American actor and director
  1943   – Dante Ferretti, Italian art director and costume designer
  1943   – Bob "The Bear" Hite, American singer-songwriter and musician (d. 1981)
1944 – Christopher Hope, South African author and poet
  1944   – Ronald Lauder, American businessman and diplomat, United States Ambassador to Austria
1945 – Peter Brock, Australian racing driver (d. 2006)
  1945   – Marta Kristen, Norwegian-American actress
1946 – Colin Bell, English footballer (d. 2021)
  1946   – Ahmed Zewail, Egyptian-American chemist and academic, Nobel Prize laureate (d. 2016)
1947 – Sandie Shaw, English singer and psychotherapist
1948 – Sharyn McCrumb, American author
1949 – Simon Crean, Australian trade union leader and politician, 14th Australian Minister for the Arts
  1949   – Elizabeth George, American author and educator
  1949   – Emma Kirkby, English soprano
1950 – Jonathan Cain, American singer-songwriter, keyboard player, and producer 
  1950   – Helen Clark, New Zealand academic and politician, 37th Prime Minister of New Zealand
1951 – Wayne Goss, Australian lawyer and politician, 34th Premier of Queensland (d. 2014)
1953 – Michael Bolton, American singer-songwriter and actor 
  1953   – Barbara Niven, American actress and writer
1954 – Prince Ernst August of Hanover
  1954   – Recep Tayyip Erdoğan, Turkish politician, 12th President of Turkey
1955 – Andreas Maislinger, Austrian historian and academic, founded the Austrian Holocaust Memorial Service
1956 – Michel Houellebecq, French author, poet, screenwriter, and director
1957 – David Beasley, American lawyer and politician, 113th Governor of South Carolina
  1957   – Keena Rothhammer, American swimmer
1958 – Greg Germann, American actor and director
  1958   – Susan Helms, American general, engineer, and astronaut
  1958   – Tim Kaine, American lawyer and politician, 70th Governor of Virginia
1959 – Ahmet Davutoğlu, Turkish political scientist, academic, and politician, 37th Prime Minister of Turkey
1960 – Jaz Coleman, English singer-songwriter, keyboard player, and producer
1962 – Ahn Cheol-soo, South Korean physician, academic, and politician
1963 – Chase Masterson, American actress, singer, and activist
1965 – James Mitchell, American wrestler and manager
1966 – Garry Conille, Haitian physician and politician, 14th Prime Minister of Haiti
  1966   – Marc Fortier, French-Canadian ice hockey player
  1966   – Najwa Karam, Lebanese singer
1967 – Mark Carroll, Australian rugby league player
  1967   – Kazuyoshi Miura, Japanese footballer
  1967   – Gene Principe, Canadian sports reporter and broadcaster
1968 – Tim Commerford, American bass player
1969 – Hitoshi Sakimoto, Japanese composer and producer
1970 – Mark Harper, English accountant and politician, Minister of State for Immigration
  1970   – Scott Mahon, Australian rugby league player 
1971 – Erykah Badu, American singer-songwriter, producer, and actress 
  1971   – Max Martin, Swedish-American record producer and songwriter
  1971   – Hélène Segara, French singer-songwriter and actress
1973 – Marshall Faulk, American football player
  1973   – Ole Gunnar Solskjær, Norwegian footballer and manager
  1973   – Jenny Thompson, American swimmer
1974 – Sébastien Loeb, French racing driver
  1974   – Mikee Cojuangco-Jaworski, Filipina television actress, host and equestrienne
1976 – Nalini Anantharaman, French mathematician
  1976   – Chad Urmston, American singer-songwriter and guitarist 
1977 – Marty Reasoner, American ice hockey player and coach
  1977   – Tim Thomas, American basketball player
  1977   – Shane Williams, Welsh rugby union player
1978 – Abdoulaye Faye, Senegalese footballer
1979 – Corinne Bailey Rae, English singer-songwriter and guitarist
  1979   – Steve Evans, Welsh footballer
  1979   – Pedro Mendes, Portuguese international footballer
1980 – Steve Blake, American basketball player
1981 – Kertus Davis, American race car driver
  1981   – Oh Seung-bum, South Korean footballer
1982 – Li Na, Chinese tennis player
  1982   – Matt Prior, South African-English cricketer
  1982   – Nate Ruess, American singer-songwriter 
1983 – Jerome Harrison, American football player
  1983   – Pepe, Brazilian-Portuguese footballer
1984 – Emmanuel Adebayor, Togolese international footballer
  1984   – Natalia Lafourcade, Mexican singer-songwriter
  1984   – Beren Saat, Turkish actress
1985 – Fernando Llorente, Spanish international footballer
1986 – Hannah Kearney, American skier
1989 – Gabriel Obertan, French footballer
1990 – Takanoiwa Yoshimori, Mongolian sumo wrestler
1991 – Lee Chae-rin, South Korean singer
1992 – Mikael Granlund, Finnish professional hockey player
  1992   – Michael Chee Kam, New Zealand rugby league player
1993 – Morgan Gautrat, American soccer player
1997 – Reghan Tumilty, Scottish footballer

Deaths

Pre-1600
420 – Porphyry of Gaza, Greek bishop and saint (b. 347)
 943 – Muirchertach mac Néill, king of Ailech (Ireland)
1154 – Roger II of Sicily (b. 1095)
1266 – Manfred, King of Sicily (b. 1232)
1275 – Margaret of England, Queen consort of Scots (b. 1240)
1349 – Fatima bint al-Ahmar, Nasrid princess in the Emirate of Granada (b. c.1260)
1360 – Roger Mortimer, 2nd Earl of March, English commander (b. 1328)
1462 – John de Vere, 12th Earl of Oxford, English politician (b. 1408)
1548 – Lorenzino de' Medici, Italian writer and assassin (b. 1514)
1577 – Eric XIV of Sweden (b. 1533)

1601–1900
1603 – Maria of Austria, Holy Roman Empress, spouse of Maximilian II (b. 1528)
1608 – John Still, English bishop (b. 1543)
1611 – Antonio Possevino, Italian priest and diplomat (b. 1533)
1625 – Anna Vasa of Sweden, Polish and Swedish princess (b. 1568)
1630 – William Brade, English violinist and composer (b. 1560)
1638 – Claude Gaspard Bachet de Méziriac, French mathematician and linguist (b. 1581)
1723 – Thomas d'Urfey, English poet and playwright (b. 1653)
1726 – Maximilian II Emanuel, Elector of Bavaria (b. 1662)
1770 – Giuseppe Tartini, Italian violinist and composer (b. 1692)
1790 – Joshua Rowley, English admiral (b. 1730)
1802 – Esek Hopkins, American admiral (b. 1718)
1806 – Thomas-Alexandre Dumas, Haitian-French general (b. 1762)
1813 – Robert R. Livingston, American lawyer and politician, 1st United States Secretary of Foreign Affairs (b. 1746)
1815 – Prince Josias of Saxe-Coburg-Saalfeld (b. 1737)
1821 – Joseph de Maistre, French lawyer and diplomat (b. 1753)
1839 – Sybil Ludington, American figure of the American Revolutionary War (b. 1761)
1864 – Louis-Hippolyte Lafontaine, Canadian jurist and politician, 3rd Premier of Canada East (b. 1807)
1869 – Afzal-ud-Daulah, Asaf Jah V, 5th Nizam of Hyderabad State
1883 – Alexandros Koumoundouros, Greek lawyer and politician, 56th Prime Minister of Greece (b. 1817)
1887 – Anandi Gopal Joshi, First Indian women physician (b. 1865)
1889 – Karl Davydov, Russian cellist and composer (b. 1838)

1901–present
1903 – Richard Jordan Gatling, American engineer, invented the Gatling gun (b. 1818)
1906 – Jean Lanfray, Swiss convicted murderer (b. 1874)
1913 – Felix Draeseke, German composer and academic (b. 1835)
1921 – Carl Menger, Polish-Austrian economist and academic (b. 1840)
1930 – Mary Whiton Calkins, American philosopher and psychologist (b. 1863)
1931 – Otto Wallach, German chemist and academic, Nobel Prize laureate (b. 1847)
1936 – February 26 Incident:
Takahashi Korekiyo, Japanese accountant and politician, 20th Prime Minister of Japan (b. 1854)
Saitō Makoto, Japanese admiral and politician, 30th Prime Minister of Japan (b. 1858)
Jōtarō Watanabe, Japanese general (b. 1874)
1943 – Theodor Eicke, German general (b. 1892)
1945 – Sándor Szurmay, Minister of Defence of the Hungarian portion of Austria-Hungary (b. 1860)
1947 – Heinrich Häberlin, Swiss judge and politician, President of the Swiss National Council (b. 1868)
1950 – Harry Lauder, Scottish comedian and singer (b. 1870)
1951 – Sabiha Kasimati, Albanian ichthyologist (b. 1912) executed with 20 others
1952 – Theodoros Pangalos, Greek general and politician, President of Greece (b. 1878)
1961 – Karl Albiker, German sculptor, lithographer, and educator (b. 1878)
  1961   – Mohammed V of Morocco (b. 1909)
1966 – Vinayak Damodar Savarkar, Indian poet and politician (b. 1883)
1969 – Levi Eshkol, Israeli soldier and politician, 3rd Prime Minister of Israel (b. 1895)
  1969   – Karl Jaspers, German-Swiss psychiatrist and philosopher (b. 1883)
1981 – Robert Aickman, English author and activist (b. 1914)
  1981   – Howard Hanson, American composer, conductor, and educator (b. 1896)
1985 – Tjalling Koopmans, Dutch-American economist and mathematician, Nobel Prize laureate (b. 1910)
1989 – Roy Eldridge, American trumpet player (b. 1911)
1993 – Constance Ford, American model and actress (b. 1923)
1994 – Bill Hicks, American comedian (b. 1961)
1995 – Jack Clayton, English director and producer (b. 1921)
1997 – David Doyle, American actor (b. 1929)
1998 – Theodore Schultz, American economist and academic, Nobel Prize laureate (b. 1902)
2000 – George L. Street III, American captain, Medal of Honor recipient (b. 1913)
  2000   – Raosaheb Gogte, Indian industrialist (b. 1916)
2002 – Lawrence Tierney, American actor (b. 1919)
  2004   – Adolf Ehrnrooth, Finnish general (b. 1905)
  2004   – Boris Trajkovski, Macedonian politician, 2nd President of the Republic of Macedonia (b. 1956)
2005 – Jef Raskin, American computer scientist, created Macintosh (b. 1943)
2006 – Georgina Battiscombe, British biographer (b. 1905)
2008 – Bodil Udsen, Danish actress (b. 1925)
2009 – Johnny Kerr, American basketball player, coach, and sportscaster (b. 1932)
  2009   – Wendy Richard, English actress (b. 1943)
  2009   – Norm Van Lier, American basketball player, coach, and sportscaster (b. 1947)
2010 – Jun Seba, also known as "Nujabes", Japanese record producer, DJ, composer and arranger (b. 1974)
2011 – Arnošt Lustig, Czech author, playwright, and screenwriter (b. 1926)
2012 – Richard Carpenter, English actor and screenwriter (b. 1929)
2013 – Marie-Claire Alain, French organist and educator (b. 1926)
  2013   – Stéphane Hessel, German-French diplomat and author (b. 1917)
  2013   – Simon Li, Hong Kong judge and politician (b. 1922)
2014 – Sorel Etrog, Romanian-Canadian sculptor, painter, and illustrator (b. 1933)
  2014   – Phyllis Krasilovsky, American author and academic (b. 1927)
2015 – Sheppard Frere, English historian and archaeologist (b. 1916)
  2015   – Theodore Hesburgh, American priest, theologian, educator, and academic (b. 1917)
  2015   – Earl Lloyd, American basketball player and coach (b. 1928)
  2015   – Tom Schweich, American lawyer and politician, 36th State Auditor of Missouri (b. 1960)
2016 – Andy Bathgate, Canadian ice hockey player, coach, and manager (b. 1932)
  2016   – Don Getty, Canadian football player and politician, 11th Premier of Alberta (b. 1933)
2017 – Joseph Wapner, American judge and TV personality (b. 1919)

Holidays and observances
Christian feast day:
Alexander of Alexandria
Emily Malbone Morgan (Episcopal Church (USA))
Isabelle of France
Li Tim-Oi (Anglican Church of Canada)
Porphyry of Gaza
February 26 (Eastern Orthodox liturgics)
Day of Remembrance for Victims of Khojaly Massacre (Azerbaijan)
Liberation Day (Kuwait)
Saviours' Day (Nation of Islam)

References

External links

 BBC: On This Day
 
 Historical Events on February 26

Days of the year
February